Haysville is an unincorporated community in Harbison Township, Dubois County, in the U.S. state of Indiana.

History
Haysville was laid out in about 1835. It was named in honor of Judge Willis Hayes, the original owner of the town site.

A post office was established at Haysville in 1846, and remained in operation until it was discontinued in 1914.

Geography

References

Unincorporated communities in Dubois County, Indiana
Unincorporated communities in Indiana
Jasper, Indiana micropolitan area
1835 establishments in Indiana
Populated places established in 1835